Prasinalia imperialis, the algodones white wax jewel beetle, is a species of metallic wood-boring beetle in the family Buprestidae. It is endemic to the Algodones Dunes in North America.

References

Further reading

 
 
 
 

Buprestidae
Articles created by Qbugbot
Beetles described in 1969